Robert Berry Chadwick II is a United States Navy rear admiral and surface warfare officer who serves as the commander of Carrier Strike Group 9 since July 9, 2021. He most recently served as the commander of Navy Region Hawaii and Naval Surface Group Middle Pacific from June 14, 2019 to June 18, 2021.

A native of Bethesda, Maryland, Chadwick earned his commission from the United States Naval Academy in 1991. He also earned a master's degree in National Security Affairs, Middle Eastern Affairs from the Naval Postgraduate School and a master’s degree in National Security Strategy from the National War College. His father, Stephen Chadwick also served as the 71st Commandant of Midshipmen as well as commander of Navy Region Hawaii.

Awards and decorations

References

Living people
Date of birth missing (living people)
Year of birth missing (living people)
People from Bethesda, Maryland
Military personnel from Maryland
United States Naval Academy alumni
Naval Postgraduate School alumni
National War College alumni
Recipients of the Legion of Merit
United States Navy rear admirals (lower half)